The Salimiyya Madrasa is a 16th-century madrasa in Damascus, Syria. It is part of the Sulaymaniyya Takiyya, started under the Ottoman sultan Süleyman I.

The madrasa was built after the rest of the complex, with stones which had been left over. It is possible that the madrasa was ordered by Süleyman himself right before his death in 1566 as it was called the "Sulaymaniyya Madrasa" in some sources upon completion, but over time it became known as the "Salimiyya Madrasa" (after Süleyman's son Selim II).

References

Buildings and structures completed in 1566
Buildings and structures of the Ottoman Empire
Madrasas in Damascus
1566 establishments in Ottoman Syria
16th-century establishments in Ottoman Syria